Korenevsky District is an administrative and municipal district (raion), one of the twenty-eight in Kursk Oblast, Russia. It is located in the southwest of the oblast. Its administrative center is the urban locality (a work settlement) of Korenevo. Population:  21,474 (2002 Census);  The population of Korenevo accounts for 37.0% of the district's total population.

Geography
Korenevsky District is located in the southwest of Kursk Oblast, on the border with Ukraine.  The terrain is hilly plain; the district lies on the Orel-Kursk plateau of the Central Russian Upland.  The main river in the district is the Seym River, tributary of the Desna River which flows west through Ukraine to the Dnieper River.   The district is 65 km southwest of the city of Kursk and 480 km southwest of Moscow.  The area measures 40 km (north-south), and 25 km (west-east); total area is 1,135 km2 (3.8% of Kursk Oblast).  The administrative center is the town of Korenevo.

The district is bordered on the north by Rylsky District, on the east by Lgovsky District, on the south by Sumy Raion of Ukraine, and on the west by Glushkovsky District.

References

Notes

Sources

External links
Korenevsky District on Google Maps
Korenevsky District on OpenStreetMap

Districts of Kursk Oblast